Bearberry Creek is a stream in Alberta, Canada.

The stream's name comes from the Cree Indians of the area, who harvested bearberries near its banks.

See also
List of rivers of Alberta

References

Rivers of Alberta